Rossa College (Colaiste Rosa in Irish) is a secondary school in Skibbereen, Ireland.

Secondary schools in County Cork
Buildings and structures in Skibbereen